Monica Kalyegira Mugenyi is a Ugandan lawyer and judge, who, on 4 October 2019, was nominated to sit on the Uganda Court of Appeal.

Before that, she sat on the High Court of Uganda. She was appointed to that court by president Yoweri Museveni on 17 June 2010.

Background and education
She graduated from the Faculty of Law of Makerere University, Uganda's largest and oldest public university, with a Bachelor of Laws, circa 1992. The following year, she was awarded a Diploma in Legal Practice by the Law Development Centre in Kampala, Uganda's capital city. She also holds a Master of Laws in International Trade Law, from the University of Essex in the United Kingdom.

Career
Prior to her ascension to the bench, she was in private practice at Mugenyi & Company Advocates and had served as the manager of corporate services at the Uganda Road Fund. She also previously worked in the Office of the Attorney General and in the Privatization Unit. At the High Court, she was seconded to the East African Court of Justice (EACJ), where she serves as the "Principal Judge". In October 2019, she was named to sit on the Uganda Court of Appeal, pending approval by the Parliament of Uganda.

See also
Jane Kiggundu
Lydia Mugambe
Ministry of Justice and Constitutional Affairs (Uganda)

References

External links
Judge dragged to court over land deal
Press Release: Court dismisses Case against Uganda and SG on the alleged Failure to Investigate Business related to Trafficking of Military Goods (5 November 2015)

1969 births
Living people
Ugandan women lawyers
Ugandan women judges
Makerere University alumni
Law Development Centre alumni
Alumni of the University of Essex
People from Western Region, Uganda
Justices of the High Court of Uganda
Justices of the East African Court of Justice
Ugandan judges of international courts and tribunals
Justices of the Court of Appeal of Uganda
21st-century women judges